The St. James Court Art Show, colloquially called the St. James Art Fair, or just St. James, is a popular free public outdoor annual arts and crafts show held since 1957 in the Old Louisville neighborhood of Louisville, Kentucky, in the St. James-Belgravia Historic District. Mostly situated to the south of Central Park, the show is normally held on the first weekend in October, and includes more than 700 artisans from various locations throughout the Americas. The show draws nearly 300,000 people, one-third from out of state, each year. The show is put together by a group of various neighborhood associations in Old Louisville.

The art and item selection at the show runs from the mundane to the sublime, and the inexpensive to the very expensive. Booths featuring such items as furniture, pottery, jewelry, glassworks, photography and paintings are lined up on streets and sidewalks with ample walk spaces between them to handle large crowds. Booths with the highest showcase quality are situated on St. James Court, Belgravia Court and Magnolia Avenue, while booths on Fourth and Third Streets tend to purvey more consumer-oriented artistic items. The 19th century mansion Conrad-Caldwell House, on St. James Court, is open for tours during the show.

In addition to the various items for sale, the show attracts various state and local politicians, charities, churches, radio stations and publishers who take the opportunity to promote themselves to the public.

The event is sponsored by various corporate donors. There are various awards given out for "Best of Show," "People's Choice," the poster contest and several scholarships. The show has been ranked #1 in the nation by Sunshine Artist Magazine.

Being held in the neighborhood Old Louisville has a particular significance because the St James Art show was founded in order to produce revenue and sustain the surrounding area. Old Louisville at the time the St James Art Show was created was in a financial decline; however, today it is known as one of the most popular areas of Louisville. Old Louisville became a historic district in 1975, and also has the United States largest collection of Victorian style homes. This unique atmosphere creates the perfect location for the St James Art Show, as the art show is almost exclusively outdoors, and people enjoy walking around the neighborhood.

The 2020 show went virtual due to the COVID-19 pandemic, but the 2021 show resumed in person.

See also 

 List of attractions and events in the Louisville metropolitan area
 Southern Exposition

References

External links
 

Recurring events established in 1957
Art festivals in the United States
Festivals in Louisville, Kentucky
1957 establishments in Kentucky
October events